Stibara trilineata is a species of beetle in the family Cerambycidae. It was first described by Frederick William Hope in 1840.

References

Saperdini
Beetles described in 1840